Land's End Plantation may refer to:

Land's End Plantation (Scott, Arkansas), listed on the National Register of Historic Places (NRHP)
Land's End Plantation (Stonewall, Louisiana), also NRHP-listed

See also
Land's End (disambiguation)